The Marlow Medal and Prize is an early-career award in physical chemistry given by the Royal Society of Chemistry. One or two prizewinners each year, who must be junior researchers under 35 or within 10 years of completing their doctorate, receive £2000 and hold lectures at universities in the UK. The award was established in 1957 and commemorates the chemist George Stanley Withers Marlow (1889–1948).

Award winners are also entitled to £3000 in travel expenses to give a lecture tour in Australia, New Zealand, Singapore or Malaysia. This lecture series, instituted in 1981, is named for Robert Anthony Robinson (1903–1979).

Winners

See also

 List of chemistry awards

References

Awards of the Royal Society of Chemistry